Voices of the W.I. is the debut album by Women's Institute-founded British group The Harmonies, released on 25 October 2010 by Universal Music. The album is a collection of covers, including the Women's Institute theme song "Jerusalem", as well as two new songs. The album's first single, "Jerusalem" was released on 12 December 2010.

History
The five members of the band were picked in July 2010 and following a £1 million record deal signed with Universal, work on the album began immediately in Abbey Road Studios, London. The album was finished by September 2010, around the time the line-up of the band was announced.

Promotion
The group appeared on many UK TV and radio shows including Daybreak, This Morning, QVC, The One Show and BBC Radio 2, to name a few, over September and October 2010. Dates for a national arena tour have yet to be announced for early 2011.

Reviews

The Express newspaper gave the album a favourable review of three out of five, stating that "the voices are a delight and the production sweet but it’s the song choices that make this a winner, from the WI theme tune Jerusalem through You’ve Got a Friend, Wonderful World and Annie’s Song" saying further that the album is "even more delicious than a pot of home-made jam".

Track listing

Charts

References

2010 debut albums
Universal Music Group albums
Covers albums